Thaddeus "Tad" Joseph (born February 23, 1963) is retired male amateur boxer from Grenada, who fought at the 1988 Summer Olympics in the men's Bantamweight division. He also represented Grenada at the 1987 Pan American Games.

1988 Olympic results
Below is the record of Tad Joseph, a bantamweight boxer from Grenada who competed at the 1988 Seoul Olympics:

 Round of 64: lost to Jose Garcia (Mexico) referee stopped contest in the first round

References

Grenadian male boxers
Living people
Bantamweight boxers
Boxers at the 1988 Summer Olympics
Olympic boxers of Grenada
Boxers at the 1987 Pan American Games
Pan American Games competitors for Grenada
1963 births